Phoenix is a common name for sports teams, arising either directly from the mythological phoenix, or from places named for that creature. Teams including this name, or referred to by it, include:

Teams based in Phoenix, Arizona, United States, or the Phoenix metropolitan area 
 Arizona Cardinals, a football team (NFL), known as the Phoenix Cardinals from 1988 to 1993
 Arizona Coyotes, a hockey team (NHL), known as the Phoenix Coyotes from 1996 to 2014
 Arizona Diamondbacks, a baseball team (MLB); the only major Phoenix-based team that has never borne the city's name
 Phoenix Mercury, a women's basketball team (WNBA)
 Phoenix Rising FC, a soccer team (USLC), known as the Arizona United SC from 2014 to 2016
 Phoenix Suns, a men's basketball team (NBA)

Other teams 
 Phoenix Cricket Club, the cricket team from Bangalore which played its debut match on January 26, 2018, at Central College, Bangalore
 Elon Phoenix, the athletic teams of Elon University in the United States
 Green Bay Phoenix, the athletic teams of the University of Wisconsin-Green Bay in the United States
 Leicester Phoenix, a rugby league football club in England
 1. FC Phönix Lübeck, a German association football club
 Manchester Phoenix, an ice hockey team in England
 Melbourne Phoenix, a netball team in Australia
 South East Melbourne Phoenix, a basketball team in Australia
 Phoenix Baia Mare, a football club in Romania
 Phoenix Cricket Club, in Ireland
 Phoenix Hagen, a basketball club in Germany
 Tawe Phoenix Boat Club, the alumni club of Swansea University Rowing Club in the United Kingdom
 Wellington Phoenix FC, a football club in New Zealand, which came about after a previous New Zealand team in the A-League competition folded, making them also an example of a Phoenix Club.
 Yorkshire Phoenix, a cricket club in England
 Tamworth Phoenix, an American Football club in England

Motorsports 
 Phoenix Racing, a NASCAR team
 Phoenix Racing (Germany), a touring car and GT racing team

See also
 Phoenix (disambiguation)
 Phoenix club (sports)